Kevin Westmore is a Hollywood make-up artist and part of the fourth generation of the Westmore family. The son of Marvin Westmore, he has worked on a number of productions, including The X-Files (which he has won two Emmys for) and Demolition Man.

His more recent project was Department Head of 7th Heaven.

See also

Westmore family

References

American make-up artists
Living people
Place of birth missing (living people)
Year of birth missing (living people)
Kevin